The International Journal of Comic Art is a journal about comics art, published twice a year. It was established in 1999 by John Lent (Temple University), who is also the editor-in-chief. The journal is independently published and does not maintain an online edition, although tables of contents are available online. The journal was established to create a new venue for scholars to publish academic work on comics.

A parody, Interplanetary Journal of Comic Art: A Festschrift in Honor of John Lent, edited by Michael Rhode and including a back cover by Ralph Steadman, was presented to Lent for his 70th birthday.

References

External links
 

Arts journals
Biannual journals
Comics scholars
English-language journals
Publications established in 1999